Rehearing may refer to:

 In law, a rehearing is a procedure where a tribunal reconsiders a matter after previously conducting a hearing on the same matter
 Parties generally request rehearings by filing a "petition for rehearing" or a "motion for rehearing"
 This process should not be confused with a petition for review, which is a procedure for requesting a matter to be reconsidered by an appellate tribunal
 Some tribunals permit rehearings en banc, where a new hearing is conducted by all members of the tribunal, or a larger group of members, rather than a select panel of members
 In parliamentary procedure, rehearing may refer to the reconsideration of a motion
 In the performing arts, the term rehearing may refer to a rehearsal